Imanbek Maratuly Zeikenov (born 21 October 2000), known mononymously as Imanbek, is a Kazakh electronic dance music record producer.  In 2019, he became known for his remix of Saint Jhn's "Roses". In 2021, Imanbek won a Grammy for his remix of "Roses", becoming the first Grammy recipient from Kazakhstan, and the first Grammy award winner in a non-classical category from within the CIS.

Career
Born in Kazakhstan, he comes from the town of Aksu and has played the guitar since the age of 8. He studied and worked in rail transport (at one point he worked at the Aksu railway station), but has been engaged in music production since 2017. His remix of "Roses" by Guyanese-American rapper Saint Jhn brought him international attention. (The remix was done without Saint Jhn's involvement as Zeikenov's attempts to contact him on Instagram failed and he did not receive a reply.) It has appeared in the charts throughout Europe including Belgium, Hungary, Netherlands, Poland, India and Sweden, becoming number 1 on Shazam World. Based on the success and popularity of the remix, the original song recorded in 2016 appeared on the US Billboard chart, the UK Singles Chart and other charts in Austria, Canada, Denmark, France, Germany, and Ireland in 2019. He has signed with the Russian label Effective Records  and released his first song on KSHMR's label Dharma Worldwide, a sublabel of Spinnin Records. On 24 November 2020, he was nominated for a Grammy Award in the category of Best Remixed Recording for his remix of Saint Jhn's "Roses".

On 12 February 2021, Imanbek released Bang, a collaborative 4-track extended play (EP) with English singer Rita Ora. It was released simultaneously alongside its lead single "Big" with French DJ David Guetta and featuring American rapper Gunna. Argentine trap artist Khea features on the song "Mood" which also appears on the EP.

On 15 March 2021, Imanbek won a Grammy for his remix of "Roses", becoming the first person from Kazakhstan to win a Grammy.

In May 2021, Imanbek won the 2021 Billboard Music Award for Top Dance/Electronic Song. He received the award for his remix “Roses” originally released by Saint Jhn in 2016.

On 11 June 2021, Imanbek released his new song "Sweet Dreams" with English-Norwegian producer Alan Walker. The music video was uploaded to Alan Walker's official channel. The music video currently has 24 million views. He released a remix contest of Sweet Dreams in partnership with the digital workstation, FL Studio and Alan Walker.

Discography

Extended plays

Singles

Other releases
Imanbek has a number of other releases, most notably:
 "Valentino" (with 24kGoldn)
"SAD" (with Rasster)
"Take Me" (with O'Neill)
"Hot" (with Parah Dice)
"Smoke It Up" (with Stephanskiy)
"Dope"
"Clandestina" (with Filv and Edmofo featuring Emma Peters)
"Voyage, Voyage" (with Duboss)
"Romantic Dance" (with DJ Dmimixer featuring Murana)
"Summertime Sadness"
"Hey Baby" (with Afrojack featuring Gia Koka)
"Bam" (with Kddk and Ya Rick)

Awards and nominations

{| class="wikitable sortable plainrowheaders" 
|-
! scope="col" | Award
! scope="col" | Year
! scope="col" | Nominee(s)
! scope="col" | Category
! scope="col" | Result
! scope="col" class="unsortable"| 
|-
!scope="row"|Grammy Awards
| 2021
| "Roses" (Imanbek Remix)
| Best Remixed Recording
| 
| 
|-
!scope="row"|UK Music Video Awards
| 2021
| "Goodbye" (with Goodboys)
| Best Dance/Electronic Video - UK
| 
|

Notes

References

Kazakhstani record producers
2000 births
Living people
Grammy Award winners
People from Almaty Region
FL Studio users
Kazakhstani DJs